General Nathaniel Woodhull (December 30, 1722 – September 20, 1776) was a leader of the New York Provincial Congress and a brigadier general of the New York Militia during the American Revolution.

Biography
Woodhull was born on December 30, 1722, in Mastic, Long Island, Province of New York, to Nathaniel Woodhull and Sarah Smith Woodhull. His family had been prominent in New York affairs since the mid seventeenth century.
  
In 1758 the thirty-six year old Woodhull joined the New York provincial forces, where he held the rank of major. He fought in numerous battles during the French and Indian War. He was at the Battle of Carillon under General Abercromby, and at the Battle of Fort Frontenac under General Bradstreet. In 1760, as colonel of the 3rd Regiment of New York Provincials took part in the invasion of Canada under General Amherst. After the end of hostilities, he returned to farming and community affairs. 
In 1761 he married  Ruth Floyd, the sister of William Floyd a signer of the Declaration of Independence. Sentiment against England's taxation of the colonies led to Suffolk County electing Woodhull to Province of New York assembly. From 1769 to 1775 he served as a member of the Province of New York assembly for Suffolk County. As such, he spoke against the Crown's colonial policies. He represented Suffolk also in the convention which chose delegates to the First Continental Congress, and in the New York Provincial Congress. In May 1775, the Provincial Congress assumed control of the colony and reorganized the militia. In August, 1775, Woodhull was elected president of the New York Provincial Congress.

In October 1775 he was made brigadier general of the Suffolk and Queen's County militia. In August 1776, on the eve of the Battle of Long Island,  Woodhull's militia was detailed to drive livestock east to prevent its falling into British hands. Woodhull's troops had driven 1,400 cattle out onto the Hempstead Plains and with 300 more ready to go. A severe thunderstorm drove the general to take refuge in a tavern run by Increase Carpenter, about two miles east of Jamaica in what is now Hollis. Relief was not forthcoming, and his situation deteriorated.

Woodhull was captured near Jamaica by a detachment of Fraser's Highlanders led by captain Sir James Baird. He was struck with a sword multiple times, injuring his arm and head by a British officer purportedly for not saying, "God save the King", as ordered, saying instead "God save us all". He was taken to a cattle transport, serving as a prison ship in Gravesend Bay. A sympathetic British officer had him transferred to the century-old house built by Nicasius di Sille in the Dutch village of New Utrecht which is now a part of Brooklyn. The house was demolished in 1850 by the owner Baret Wyckoff. It was located in the current vicinity of 84th St. and New Utrecht Ave. His arm was amputated in an effort to save his life, he managed to call for his wife who was at his side when he died on September 20, 1776. He was buried at his family home.

Legacy
The following schools are named after Nathaniel Woodhull:
 PS 35 Nathaniel Woodhull School, Hollis, Queens
 Nathaniel Woodhull Elementary School, Shirley, New York
 Nathaniel Woodhull Intermediate School, Huntington, New York
The post office in Mastic Beach, New York is also named after Nathaniel Woodhull.

References

Jacobsen, Edna L. "Nathaniel Woodhull."  Dictionary of American Biography Base Set. American Council of Learned Societies, 1928-1936. Reproduced in Biography Resource Center. Farmington Hills, Mich.: Gale, 2008. Online April 1, 2008.

1722 births
1776 deaths
Members of the New York General Assembly
Members of the New York Provincial Assembly
Members of the New York Provincial Congress
United States military personnel killed in the American Revolutionary War
Militia generals in the American Revolution
New York (state) militiamen in the American Revolution
People from Mastic, New York
People of the Province of New York
Woodhull family
18th-century American politicians